"Dark Knight Dummo" is a song by American rapper Trippie Redd featuring fellow American rapper Travis Scott. It was released on December 6, 2017 as the lead single from Redd's debut studio album, Life's a Trip. It is his first single as a lead artist to chart on the Billboard Hot 100, and is certified 2× Platinum by the RIAA. The song has since come to be regarded as Trippie Redd's signature song.

Music video 
The music video was released on February 20, 2018, and features Trippie Redd and Travis Scott battling a horde of zombies on a farm. The video is directed by White Trash Tyler and was released to Redd's official YouTube channel. As of 2022, the video is in excess of 160 million views.

Charts

Certifications

References

2017 singles
2017 songs
Trippie Redd songs
Travis Scott songs
Songs written by Trippie Redd
Songs written by Travis Scott

Cloud rap songs